William Schmidt may refer to:

 William Schmidt (composer) (1926–2009), American composer of classical music
 William A. Schmidt (1902–1992), Wisconsin state senator
 William R. Schmidt (1889–1966), United States Army officer
 Bill Schmidt (born 1947), American Olympic javelin thrower
 William "Burro" H. Schmidt (1871–1954), builder of the Burro Schmidt Tunnel
 Billy Schmidt (1887–1975), Australian rules footballer
 Billy Schmidt (baseball) (1861–1928), American baseball player

See also
Wilhelm Schmidt (disambiguation)
William Smith (disambiguation)